James Robert Stratton (May 3, 1857 – April 19, 1916) was an Ontario businessman and political figure. He represented Peterborough West in the Legislative Assembly of Ontario from 1886 to 1904 and in the House of Commons of Canada from 1908 to 1911 as a Liberal member.

He was born in Millbrook, Durham County, Canada West in 1857, the son of James Stratton, an Irish immigrant and later customs collector at Peterborough. He married E.J. Ormond in 1881. Stratton was publisher of the Peterborough Examiner and also sold books, stationery, and wallpaper. He served as a member of the Board of Education in Peterborough. Stratton was Provincial Secretary and Registrar from 1899 to 1904. After being elected in 1908, he ran unsuccessfully for the same seat in the House of Commons in 1911.

The geographical township of Stratton in Nipissing District was named after him.

Death
While in Arkansas Stratton became ill and was put under the care of Professor K. Fiege. As treatment Fiege put Stratton on thirty-six days of fasting with only water allowed. In the last 74 hours of Stratton's life, he suffered from an unstoppable hiccuping. In an effort to stop the hiccuping Fiege used a belt to tighten his chest. The incredible pain was only relieved once Stratton's wife unbuckled the strap. After his death Professor K. Fiege was arrested for manslaughter.

References

External links

The Canadian parliamentary companion, 1891 JA Gemmill
  - father

1857 births
1916 deaths
Liberal Party of Canada MPs
Members of the House of Commons of Canada from Ontario
Ontario Liberal Party MPPs
Provincial Secretaries of Ontario